Narayan Sane (4 February 1909 – 10 April 2002) was an Indian cricket umpire. He stood in two Test matches in 1960. Sane was also a first-class cricketer between 1934 and 1949. He made one appearance for Maharashtra then played seven matches for Central Provinces and Berar.

See also
 List of Test cricket umpires
 Australian cricket team in India in 1959–60

References

1909 births
2002 deaths
Indian Test cricket umpires
Indian cricketers
Maharashtra cricketers